Ida Liu (Chinese: 劉宏敏) is a Chinese American banking executive and currently the Global Head of Citi Private Bank, a position which she has held since April 2021. She previously headed Citi Private Bank in North America.

Early life and education

Raised in Orinda, California by Mandarin speaking parents, Liu holds a B.A. with honors from Wellesley College and a Merrill Lynch Executive MBA from the Wharton School of the University of Pennsylvania. She speaks fluent Mandarin and Spanish.

Career

Early career

Liu started her career in 1998 as a mergers & acquisitions investment banker at BT Wolfensohn, now part of Deutsche Bank.
 
She joined Merrill Lynch's investment bank in 1999 and worked in both New York and Hong Kong, focusing on China and Taiwan deals in the technology, media and telecom sectors.
  
In 2004, Liu was appointed Global Head of Sales, Marketing and Business Development at womenswear designer Vivienne Tam. During her tenure, she launched the Vivienne Tam Dress line, and established flagship stores in China.

Citi Private Bank

Liu began her career at Citi Private Bank in 2007 by launching and heading the Fashion, Retail and Entertainment Group.

In 2011, she founded Citi Private Bank’s newly formed North America Asian Clients Group   before becoming Global Market Manager for New York in 2016.

In 2019, she was promoted to head the Private Bank in North America.
  
In 2021, Liu was appointed Global Head of Private Banking.

Diversity and inclusion
Liu is an advocate for diversity, inclusion and gender equality in the workplace.

She serves on Citi’s Asian Heritage Affinity, becoming its Co-Lead in November 2021 and she has spoken at the Milken Institute Global Conference on inclusivity for the Asian American and Pacific Island heritage (AAPI) community.

Liu is also a member of the Citi Women Steering Committee, a company-wide effort that is “designed to attract, develop, advance and retain female talent at all levels of the company.”  She also serves as Chair of the Citi Women’s International Women’s Day celebrations globally.

External board memberships
Liu is a trustee and board member of the Asia Society.

She is the senior sponsor of recruiting for her alma mater, Wellesley College, where she was previously a board member of the Alumnae Association. 

Liu is a Young Global Leader (YGL) of the World Economic Forum and was one of five Citi delegates at Davos in 2019 to discuss opportunities and trends in global finance and investment.

She is also a member of The Committee of 100 and Young Presidents' Organization.

Personal life

Liu is the daughter of Peter Liu, a venture capitalist who is the Founder and Chairman of WI Harper Group. Liu and her father have simultaneously been participants at the World Economic Forum at Davos.

She is married with two children.

Awards and honors
Liu has been named among Barron’s 100 Most Influential Women in U.S. Finance for three years running since 2020 and among the 10 Most Influential Women in Wealth Management for 2021.

In 2020 and 2021, American Banker named Liu as one of the 25 Most Powerful Women in Finance.

Liu has also been included in Crain’s Notable Women on Wall Street in 2021 and 2022, as well as in Crain’s 40 Under 40.

Liu received the Citi Chairman's Council Award for six consecutive years as one of the firm’s top performers between 2007 and 2014.

References

Living people
Year of birth missing (living people)
American bankers

21st-century American businesswomen
21st-century American businesspeople
Wellesley College alumni
Wharton School of the University of Pennsylvania alumni
People from Orinda, California